The 2011 Karbala bombing was an attack that took place in the city of Karbala on 25 September 2011. A car bomb exploded next to a crowded identity card office early in the morning and as people gathered to help injured in the first attack, a suicide bomber detonated his explosives.

See also

 List of terrorist incidents, 2011

References 

2011 murders in Iraq
Mass murder in 2011
2011 in Iraq
Car and truck bombings in Iraq
Suicide bombings in Iraq
Terrorist incidents in Iraq in 2011
Islamic terrorist incidents in 2011
Karbala
Violence against Shia Muslims in Iraq
September 2011 events in Iraq
Building bombings in Iraq